Mert or MERT may refer to:

People
 Mert (given name), a Turkish masculine given name and a nickname
 Mert (surname)

MERT
 Medical Emergency Response Team, British Armed Forces designation for in-theatre aeromedical evacuation units
 Multi-Environment Real-Time, Unix-based hybrid time-sharing and real-time operating system
 Penn MERT, a student-run volunteer emergency medical services organization of the University of Pennsylvania

Other uses
 Mert River, Turkey

See also
 Meret, Egyptian goddess
 Mert., standard botanical author abbreviation for Franz Carl Mertens